The 2022 FC Tobol season was the 24th successive season that the club played in the Kazakhstan Premier League, the highest tier of association football in Kazakhstan. Tobol finished the season in third place, qualifying for the 2023–24 UEFA Europa Conference League. Tobol also participated in the Kazakhstan Cup where they finished bottom of their group, won the Super Cup against Kairat, and were knocked out of the UEFA Champions League by Ferencváros in the First Qualifying Round and then the Europa Conference League at the Third Qualifying Round by Zrinjski Mostar.

Season events
On 27 January, Tobol announced the free-agent signings of Dmytro Nepohodov and Žarko Tomašević after they'd previously left Astana, and the signing of Aybar Zhaksylykov from Zhetysu.

On 25 April, Tobol announced the loan signing of Rudi Požeg Vancaš from Chornomorets Odesa.

On 16 May, Caretaker Head Coach Alexander Moskalenko left his role by mutual consent, with Milan Milanović being appointed as the clubs new Head Coach on 20 May.

On 9 June, Tobol announced the departure of Dmitry Miroshnichenko by mutual agreement. Six days later, 15 June, Tobol announced the departure of Dmytro Nepohodov by mutual agreement.

On 23 June, Tobol announced the signing of Timur Akmurzin from Spartak Moscow on a contract until the end of the season.

On 28 June, Tobol announced the signing of Serges Déblé from Pyunik on a one-year contract.

On 30 June, Tobol confirmed that Rudi Požeg Vancaš had returned to Chornomorets Odesa after his loan ended.

On 2 July, Tobol announced the signing of Miljan Vukadinović from Vojvodina on a contract until the end of 2023.

On 21 July, Tobol announced the departure of Rúben Brígido by mutual agreement.

Squad

Transfers

In

Loans in

Released

Friendlies

Competitions

Overview

Super Cup

Premier League

Results summary

Results by round

Results

League table

Kazakhstan Cup

Group stage

UEFA Champions League

Qualifying rounds

UEFA Europa Conference League

Qualifying rounds

Squad statistics

Appearances and goals

|-
|colspan="16"|Players away from Tobol on loan:
|-
|colspan="16"|Players who left Tobol during the season:

|}

Goal scorers

Clean sheets

Disciplinary record

References

External links
Official Website

FC Tobol seasons
Tobol
Tobol
Tobol